The Late Great Planet Earth is a best-selling 1970 book by Hal Lindsey with Carole C. Carlson, and first published by Zondervan. The New York Times declared it to be the bestselling nonfiction book of the 1970s. The book was first featured on a primetime television special featuring Hal Lindsey in 1974 and 1975 with an audience of 17,000,000 and produced by Alan Hauge of GMT Productions. It was adapted by Rolf Forsberg and Robert Amram into a 1978 film narrated by Orson Welles and released by Pacific International Enterprises. It was originally ghost-written by Carlson, whom later printings credited as co-author. Lindsey and Carlson later published several sequels, including Satan Is Alive and Well on Planet Earth and The 1980s: Countdown to Armageddon.

Description
The Late Great Planet Earth is a treatment of literalist, premillennial, dispensational eschatology. As such, it compared end-time prophecies in the Bible with then-current events in an attempt to predict future scenarios resulting in the rapture of believers before the tribulation and Second Coming of Jesus to establish his thousand-year (i.e. millennial) kingdom on Earth.  Emphasizing various passages in the books of Daniel, Ezekiel and Revelation, Lindsey originally suggested the possibility that these climactic events might occur during the 1980s, which he interpreted as one generation from the foundation of modern Israel during 1948, a major event according to some conservative evangelical schools of eschatological thought. Cover art of the Bantam edition suggested that the 1970s were the "era of the Antichrist as foretold by Moses and Jesus," and termed the book "a penetrating look at incredible ancient prophecies involving this generation." Descriptions of alleged "fulfilled" prophecy were offered as proof of the infallibility of God's word, and evidence that "unfulfilled" prophecies would soon find their denouement in God's plan for the planet.

He cited an increase in the frequency of famines, wars and earthquakes, as major events just prior to the end of the world. He also foretold a Soviet invasion of Israel (War of Gog and Magog). Lindsey also predicted that the European Economic Community, which preceded the European Union, was destined (according to Biblical prophecy) to become a "United States of Europe", which in turn he says is destined to become a "Revived Roman Empire" ruled by the Antichrist. Lindsey wrote that he had concluded, since there was no apparent mention of America in the books of Daniel or Revelation, that America would not be a major geopolitical power by the time the tribulations of the end times arrived. He found little in the Bible that could represent the U.S., but he suggested that Ezekiel 38:13 could be speaking of the U.S. in part.

Although Lindsey did not claim to know the dates of future events with any certainty, he suggested that Matthew 24:32-34 indicated that Jesus' return might be within "one generation" of the rebirth of the state of Israel, and the rebuilding of the Jewish Temple, and Lindsey asserted that "in the Bible" one generation is forty years. Some readers accepted this as an indication that the Tribulation or the Rapture would occur no later than 1988. In his 1980 work The 1980s: Countdown to Armageddon, Lindsey predicted that "the decade of the 1980s could very well be the last decade of history as we know it".

The Late Great Planet Earth was the first Christian prophecy book to be published by a secular publisher (Bantam, 1973) and sell many copies.  Despite some dated content, 28 million copies had sold by 1990.

Film adaptation
The film version was narrated by Orson Welles and released in theaters in January 1978. 

Welles opens by providing background information on the importance of prophets such as Jeremiah, Isaiah, Ezekiel and Amos in foretelling the arrival of Jesus as the Messiah.  He also describes the visions of John of Patmos.

Hal Lindsey makes multiple appearances providing Biblical context to historical and then-current events, linking them to Biblical prophecy.  He focuses on three key events prior to the arrival of the Antichrist:

 The establishment of Israel in 1948.
 Jerusalem's return to Israeli hands in 1967.
 The restoration of the Temple of Solomon at some point in the near future.

Additional interviewees detail then-current and anticipated future crises facing humanity:

 International relations
 Dr. Aurelio Pecci; President, The Club of Rome
 Dr. George Wald; Scientist, Nobel Prize winner
 Dr. Norman Borlaug; Nobel Peace Prize winner
 Dr. Emile Benoit; Economist, Columbia University
 Dr. Desmond Morris; author of The Naked Ape

 Natural disasters
 Dr. John Gribbin; author of The Jupiter Effect
 Dr. Paul Ehrlich; author of The Population Bomb
 Dr. William Paddock; author of Famine 1975!

 Nuclear war (international and via terrorism)
 Joseph Waggoner, Jr.; US Congressman
 Dr. George Kistiakowsky; Atomic scientist, Harvard University
 Dr. George Rathjens; Professor of Political Science, MIT
 Chaim Herzog; Israeli ambassador to the UN

 Pollution, genetic engineering, plague
 Dr. Jacques Piccard; Institut International d'Ecologie
 Albert Rosenfield; author of The Second Genesis

 New Age/alternative religions
 Babetta; witch
 Erin Cameron; astrologer
 Tal Brooke; author of Lord of the Air
 Maharishi Mahesh Yogi

 Civil unrest
 Dr. Robert Nisbet; Sociologist, Columbia University

 Computers/"Mark of the Beast"
 Peter Hamilton; computer security expert

 Warfare
 Elmo Zumwalt; Former Chief of Naval Operations

Reception of the film
People Magazine said "Lindsey splices Bible prophecies of doom with contemporary signs. For instance, he says the Bible pinpoints Israel's rebirth as a nation as the catalyst to Judgment Day, which will probably occur by 1988.  The intervening years will see the emergence of a 10-nation confederacy (prophet Daniel's dreadful 10-horned beast) or, as Lindsey sees it, the European Common Market. Eventually Russia (biblical Magog) will attack Israel and precipitate a global nuclear war. Only Jesus' followers will be spared. Hence, Lindsey advises, "the only thing you need to understand is that God offers you in Jesus Christ a full pardon."

Marc Jacobson wrote in The Village Voice, "Therein lies the major fault of The Late Great Planet Earth. To me, the Apocalypse is an intensely personal thing. I really don't need some self-help creep handing out a cover version. Every thinking human can and should conjure up his own version of doom, just like the graybeards in the Bible did. Screw ecologists. I stand with Carl Sandburg-a factory is as beautiful as a tree. Nuclear power doesn't scare me either. Not at all. I like watching slow-motion films of mushroom clouds; they have a restful, narcotic effect on me. Some day I hope to watch a four-hour VTR tape of A-bomb explosions on a seven-foot TV screen as I drink beer. In fact, I think it's fair to say I have a love-hate relationship with nuclear holocaust."

Franklin Harris of Splice Today wrote, "Coming nine years after Lindsey's book, the movie version of The Late Great Planet Earth was late to its own party. The Omen had already turned the Apocalypse into big-budget summer spectacle in 1976, and the steam was running out of the pseudo-historical documentary genre pioneered by Sunn Classic Pictures, which released In Search of Noah’s Ark, The Bermuda Triangle, and The Lincoln Conspiracy. But The Omen was the No. 4 movie at the domestic box office in 1976, raking in $60.1 million. The No. 5 movie was, improbably, In Search of Noah’s Ark, with a domestic tally of $55.7 million. So, the producers of The Late Great Planet Earth figured there was still money to be made. There was, although not nearly as much: in 1978, The Late Great Planet Earth grossed $19.5 million domestically against an estimated budget of $11 million."

The New York Times noted, "The efficacy of the film's scare tactics is minimized by its applying biblical predictions too generally, and almost cavalierly at times – the most memorable sequence shows a computer conducting a numerological analysis of various politicians' names, to figure out if Jimmy Carter, Ronald Reagan or Ted Kennedy is the Antichrist. And Hal Lindsey, who co-wrote the book upon which the film is based and who appears with Mr. Welles as a co-narrator, speaks coolly, almost enthusiastically, about the prospect of worldwide destruction."

See also
 2012 phenomenon
 Apocalyptic literature
 Bible prophecy
 Death from the Skies, book
 Left Behind
 Human extinction
 Rapture
 Unfulfilled Christian religious predictions

References

External links
 David Kordahl, Apocalypse Ha!  The Homing Pigeon Experience.  January 8, 2011.
 Micro-Brewed Reviews, L is for The Late, Great Planet Earth (1979).  October 27, 2019.
 The Voice Archives, Orson Welles Picks Up a Paycheck for the Apocalypse.  The Village Voice.  October 30, 2018.
 Review, The Late Great Planet Earth (1979); Kino Lorber/Scorpion Blu-Ray Release.
 William Martin, Waiting for the End; The growing interest in apocalyptic prophesy.  The Atlantic.  June 1982.

Christian apocalyptic writings
Prophecy in Christianity
1970 non-fiction books
Christian Zionism
English-language books
Zondervan books
Collaborative non-fiction books
Non-fiction books adapted into films
Rapture